Lahstedt is a former municipality in the district of Peine, in Lower Saxony, Germany. It was situated approximately 11 km south of Peine, and 20 km west of Braunschweig.

Lahstedt was formed on 1 February 1971 by merging the five villages of Adenstedt, Gadenstedt, Groß Lafferde, Münstedt and Oberg. "Lahstedt" itself was an artificial name, but not a population centre. Since 1 January 2015 its subdivisions are part of the municipality Ilsede.

Municipal subdivisions 
 Adenstedt
 Gadenstedt
 Groß Lafferde
 Münstedt
 Oberg

References

External links

Peine (district)
Former municipalities in Lower Saxony